The MTV Video Music Award for Best Hip Hop Video was first given out at the 1999 MTV Video Music Awards. The award, according to MTV, was originally intended for hip hop-inspired songs, not necessarily actual hip hop music videos (which were instead honored by Best Rap Video). This explains the recognition of non-hip hop songs such as "Thong Song" and "I'm Real (Remix)". The award was not given out in 2007, as the VMAs were revamped and most original categories were eliminated, however, Best Hip Hop Video was reinstated in 2008. By then, though, the rules had relatively changed, as R&B and rap videos also became eligible for nominations in this category since the awards for Best Rap Video and Best R&B Video were not brought back.

Kanye West owns the most nominations, with a total of nine. Nicki Minaj has the most wins in this category, with a total of four.

Recipients

Records

Most wins

Most nominations

See also 
 MTV Europe Music Award for Best Hip-Hop

References 

MTV Video Music Awards
Hip hop awards
Awards established in 1999